Sun Jun (Chinese: 孙军, born June 22, 1969 in Changchun, Jilin, China) is a retired Chinese professional basketball player who later served as a coach and general manager for the Jilin Northeast Tigers, as well as an assistant basketball coach with the Chinese national team. Standing 1.98 meters (6'6") tall, he played at the small forward position.

CBA career
Sun Jun spent his entire playing career with the Jilin Northeast Tigers and helped the team gain membership in the Chinese Basketball Association (CBA) in 1998. He set the league record by scoring 70 points in 139–94 win over the Jinan Army squad on December 17, 2000, a mark which stood for nearly a decade until it was broken in March 2010. Sun was an eight-time CBA All-Star, won the CBA regular season MVP award in 1999 and 2003, and led the league in scoring in 1999, 2001, and 2003.

National team career
Sun was selected to join the Chinese national youth team in 1986 and was a member of the senior squad between 1989 and 2003. He helped China win gold at the 1994 Asian Games and 1998 Asian Games, as well as achieve qualification for the 1994 FIBA World Championship, and 1992, 1996, and 2000 Summer Olympics.

Coaching career
After serving as a player-coach with the Jilin Northeast Tigers for several years, Sun eventually became the club's CEO and general manager. After an ownership shake-up pushed him out in 2007, he moved to the national team as an assistant coach, before eventually returning to fill various roles in Jilin's front office.

Career statistics

CBA statistics
Regular season and Playoffs combined

References

External Links 
 Sun Jun at olympedia.org

1969 births
Living people
Jilin Northeast Tigers players
Small forwards
Basketball players from Changchun
Chinese men's basketball players
Olympic basketball players of China
Basketball players at the 1992 Summer Olympics
Basketball players at the 1996 Summer Olympics
Basketball players at the 2000 Summer Olympics
Asian Games medalists in basketball
Asian Games gold medalists for China
Basketball players at the 1994 Asian Games
Basketball players at the 1998 Asian Games
Medalists at the 1994 Asian Games
Medalists at the 1998 Asian Games
1994 FIBA World Championship players